A general election was held in the United Kingdom on Thursday 8 June 2017; all 59 seats in Scotland were contested under the first-past-the-post electoral system.

The general election in Scotland was fought in the aftermath of the 2016 Scottish Parliament election, in which the Scottish National Party (SNP) won a third term in government but lost its overall majority in the Scottish Parliament. At that election, the Scottish Conservatives increased their number of MSPs, overtaking Labour as the largest opposition party. The 2016 EU referendum was held a month later on Thursday 23 June, and the final result was for the United Kingdom to leave the EU; despite Scotland voting 62.0% for 'Remain'. Negotiations were due to begin shortly since invocation of Article 50 of the Treaty on European Union in March 2017, which was expected to dominate the snap general election campaign.

In line with the Fixed-term Parliaments Act 2011, an election had not been due until 7 May 2020, but a call for a snap election by Prime Minister Theresa May received the necessary two-thirds majority in a 522–13 vote in the House of Commons on 19 April 2017. The Conservative Party, which has governed nationally since 2010, was defending a majority of 17 against the Labour Party, the official opposition. The third-largest party was the SNP, which had won 56 of the 59 Scottish seats at the 2015 general election.

The election resulted in the SNP remaining the largest single party in Scotland, despite losing 21 seats to pro-union candidates. This marked a 13% drop in support for the SNP, down to 36.9% of the vote. The Conservatives, at 28.6%, doubled their share of the vote and won 13 seats, while Labour won seven seats and the Liberal Democrats four seats. The Conservatives recorded their best result in Scotland since 1983 (in terms of seats won) or 1979 (in terms of share of the popular vote). Until this election the Conservatives had not been the second-largest party in Scotland since 1992 and had not been the largest unionist party in Scotland since 1955.

Defeated SNP MPs included: former SNP leader and former First Minister of Scotland Alex Salmond, SNP Westminster leader Angus Robertson, SNP Chief Whip Mike Weir; as well as John Nicolson and Tasmina Ahmed-Sheikh. Commentators suggested that the election might reduce the SNP's case for a second referendum on Scottish independence. Following the election, the SNP leader Nicola Sturgeon acknowledged that her party's plans for a second referendum were 'undoubtedly' a factor in the election results. The SNP also abandoned its fundraiser for a possible referendum after raising only half of its £1,000,000 target, just over a week before its preset deadline.

Political context
Following a referendum held on Scottish independence in 2014 which saw 44.7% of voters in Scotland vote for Scotland to become an independent state and 55.3% vote for Scotland to remain a part of the United Kingdom, the SNP won 56 of the 59 UK Parliamentary seats in Scotland at the 2015 UK general election, campaigning on a manifesto focusing on bringing greater devolved powers to Scotland following a promise made by the three main unionist parties in Scotland to bring more devolved powers to the country should it reject independence. The SNP manifesto at the 2015 general election repeatedly stated that "The SNP will always support independence - but that is not what this election is about".

Labour only returned a single MP at Edinburgh South; a reduction of 40 seats compared to the previous election. The party lost out heavily to the SNP in working-class areas around the Scottish Central Belt, with Scottish Labour's safest constituency (Glasgow North East) returning the largest swing at the general election for any seat in the UK with 39.3% from Labour to SNP. The party performed best in more affluent constituencies, with then-Scottish Labour leader Jim Murphy missing out in his former constituency of East Renfrewshire by just 3,718 votes. Labour's next closest result was at Edinburgh North and Leith, where they missed out to the SNP by 5,597 votes, and in East Lothian, where the SNP polled ahead of Labour by 6,803 votes.

The Scottish Liberal Democrats lost 10 of their 11 Westminster seats from 2010, with their safest seat in the UK - Orkney and Shetland - remaining as the only Liberal Democrat seat in Scotland. They marginally lost out to the SNP in East Dunbartonshire, where former Lib Dem MP Jo Swinson lost out to the SNP by 2,167 votes. Among those to lose their seat at the election were: former Liberal Democrat leader Charles Kennedy and the Chief Secretary to the Treasury, Danny Alexander. The Liberal Democrats finished in third place at Berwickshire, Roxburgh and Selkirk and West Aberdeenshire and Kincardine, seats which they had held at the previous election.

The Scottish Conservative Party had not held a majority of Scottish seats at a general election since 1955 and lost all Scottish representation at the 1997 general election. Since 2001, the party had held only one Scottish seat in the House of Commons. In 2005, following the re-organisation of Scottish constituencies, that seat was Dumfriesshire, Clydesdale and Tweeddale, a mostly rural constituency near the Scottish Borders. In 2015, its share of the vote in Scotland decreased by 1.8% but managed to retain Dumfriesshire, Clydesdale and Tweeddale, as its only Scottish seat. It had been reported the party could gain Berwickshire, Roxburgh and Selkirk, a seat which they lost out to the Scottish National Party by a meagre 0.6% of the vote.

The SNP polled slightly under half of the votes, 49.97%, in Scotland at the 2015 general election; the largest vote share at a general election in Scotland for a party since the Conservatives won a majority of the popular vote, 50.1%, in 1955.

The impact of the 2016 EU referendum and a proposed second Scottish independence referendum was a large theme at the snap 2017 general election. The SNP incorrectly predicted that many pro-union voters would switch allegiance to the party in order to remain within the European Union. Polling from YouGov suggests people moving towards independence as a result of Brexit would be offset by the number of previously pro-independence Leave voters saying they would vote against independence as a result of Brexit.

A study by Electoral Calculus, published on 14 May 2017, concluded that the Conservatives could win 11 seats in Scotland.

Campaign events

Television debates 
Like the rest of the United Kingdom, Scottish broadcasters hosted television debates. On 21 May, BBC Scotland announced that they would host a debate on 10 December, two days before the election, which was moderated by Sarah Smith. On 6 June, two days before the election, STV hosted a television debate from the Tramway theatre in Glasgow with the four main Scottish leaders. It was originally due to be held the week before but this was postponed until Tuesday 6 June. The debate was moderated by Bernard Ponsbury.

Opinion polling

Results

Votes summary

List of Constituencies by Party

Description of results
At the election the SNP remained the largest party in Scotland, taking the vast majority of seats situated around the more industrial Central Belt of the country, between Balloch, Dundee, Irvine, Kilmarnock and Livingston, where the campaign in favour of Scottish independence performed best at the 2014 independence referendum. The party also took the most votes and a majority of seats in three out of four major cities in Scotland (Dundee, Glasgow and Edinburgh), however Labour were within 1,200 votes of taking the most votes in Edinburgh and were within 200 votes of gaining two additional seats in Glasgow. The SNP failed to win a majority of the vote in any of Scotland's 59 constituencies.

The Scottish Conservatives performed best in areas where the campaign in favour of remaining part of the United Kingdom performed best in at the 2014 independence referendum and in areas where the campaign to leave the European Union performed best in at the 2016 EU membership referendum. The Conservatives formed the largest party in the south of the country through Dumfries and Galloway, the Scottish Borders and South Ayrshire, where they won four seats in total. They also gained the East Renfrewshire constituency, an affluent commuter suburb on the outskirts of Glasgow which was the safest Conservative constituency in Scotland before their collapse at the 1997 general election, and gained the Ochil and South Perthshire and Stirling constituencies in Central Scotland, coming within 21 votes of gaining Perth and North Perthshire, the second closest result in Scotland and the third closest across the United Kingdom as a whole. Six out of seven constituencies in the North-East of Scotland voted Conservative, including former SNP party leader and First Minister of Scotland Alex Salmond's constituency of Gordon, and the SNP Westminster leader Angus Robertson's seat of Moray. Two out of three seats covering the city of Aberdeen returned Conservative MP's. In a profile of the seat of Moray for The Guardian after the election, journalist Severin Carrell summarised the result: "Moray had been an SNP seat for 30 years but... using Brexit as the basis for a second independence vote so soon after 2014 crystallised an irritation with the party brewing for several years. The Tory cry that Sturgeon needed “to get on with the day job” resonated."

Scottish Labour retained their Edinburgh South constituency with a significant majority of 15,514 votes (32.4%), making it the safest constituency in Scotland. They also regained a number of previously safe Labour working-class constituencies in the Central Belt of Scotland, including Coatbridge, Chryston and Bellshill, Glasgow North East, Kirkcaldy and Cowdenbeath and Rutherglen and Hamilton West, gaining a further two seats in Lothian (East Lothian and Midlothian). The party were within 1,400 votes of gaining a further six seats from the SNP in Greater Glasgow.

The Liberal Democrats gained the suburban constituencies of East Dunbartonshire and Edinburgh West on the outskirts of Glasgow and Edinburgh respectively. The party also regained their former heartland of Caithness, Sutherland and Easter Ross, a large rural constituency covering the northernmost parts of Great Britain, with Orkney and Shetland again becoming the safest Lib Dem constituency in the UK in vote share terms, with a majority 19.6% of the vote. They lost out to the SNP in the North East Fife constituency by just 2 votes (0.0%), the closest result in the United Kingdom at a general election since the result in Winchester in 1997. However, the party's vote collapsed to the Conservatives in Aberdeenshire, the Borders and in parts of the Highlands.

Target seats

Scottish Conservatives

Scottish Labour

Scottish Liberal Democrats

Scottish National Party

References

Scotland
United Kingdom General Election Results In Scotland, 2017
2010s elections in Scotland
2017